Sonal Jha (born 29 July 1971) is an Indian film and television actress. Sonal Jha is best known for her roles in films such as Lipstick Under My Burkha, 3 Storeys, Chillar Party and TV Serials such as Na Aana Is Des Laado and Balika Vadhu.

Personal life
Sonal Jha was born in Bihar, Patna and has been involved in theatre since her childhood. In Patna, she performed as an actress and singer for 15 years. Jha later moved to Delhi to pursue her postgraduate education, receiving her Master's degree in History from Delhi University.

Acting career
Jha became a member of Ekjute Theater Group, learning from personalities such as Nadira Babbar and acting in several plays throughout India. Eventually, [Prakash jha] hired Jha for his regional (Bhojpuri), in which she played the mother of Bahubali. She rose to fame as Indian soap opera's sensitive and charming mother while playing Irawati in Balika Vadhu. That made her a household name after playing equally important roles in Sapno Ke Bhanwer Main and Na Aana Is Des Laado.  Her short film MAD was a Perfect 10 winner at The Mumbai Film Festival.

Filmography

Television

Web series

Theatre

References

External links
 
 Sonal Jha – Official website

Indian film actresses
Actresses in Hindi cinema
Actresses in Hindi television
Indian television actresses
1971 births
Living people